Bahrain Synagogue is a disused synagogue located on Sasa'ah Avenue, in what is now a lower-class commercial district in Manama, the capital city of Bahrain.

Overview 
The nondescript beige structure, which cannot be identified in any way as a Jewish house of worship, is no longer in use. The tiny Jewish community in Bahrain, numbering approximately 35 out of a total population of 700,000, can rarely muster a minyan required for prayer. Nevertheless, Bahrain is one of the only Arab countries in the Persian Gulf with any kind of Jewish community or synagogue. The community also maintains a small Jewish cemetery.

History
In the late 19th century, Jews from Iraq, and some from Iran and India settled in Bahrain and subsequently established a synagogue.

After the 1947 UN Partition Plan which envisaged partitioning Palestine into Jewish and Arab states, three days of protests and marches erupted. On the third day, the demonstrators began rioting. Jewish homes were looted and the only synagogue on the island in the capital city of Manama was razed to the ground by foreign Arab rioters. Even though the tensions resulted in Jews emigrating to Britain and the United States, another synagogue was built for those who remained.

Recently, as the synagogue is no longer in use, the Jewish community wanted to convert the building for another use or give it to charity, but the government would not allow it. They insisted it remained as a synagogue.

In 2006, after the roof began to fall in, Abraham David Nonoo, the Jewish community's unofficial leader and a member of Bahrain's forty-man shura, or parliamentary council, undertook to renovate the synagogue out of his own funds, although Bahrain's Crown Prince Sheikh Salman bin Hamad Al Khalifa has offered to pay for the construction of a new synagogue on the same site.

At the time the government also offered the Jewish community a piece of land to rebuild the old synagogue which was destroyed in 1948 and not rebuilt.

A report from Al-Wasat newspaper (in Arabic) Includes photos of the new building

See also
History of the Jews in Bahrain
Umm Al Hassam

References

External links
Bahrain's crown prince, Shaloum discuss the situations of Bahraini Jews, ArabicNews.com

Edot HaMizrach
Jews and Judaism in Bahrain
Synagogues in the Middle East
Religious buildings and structures in Bahrain
Buildings and structures in Manama
Orthodox synagogues
Tourist attractions in Manama
Orthodox Judaism in the Arab world
Orthodox Judaism in the Middle East